Juergen Uldedaj (born 26 August 1997) is an Albanian-born German professional boxer.

Professional boxing career
Uldedaj made his professional debut against Mateusz Gatek on 14 December 2015. He won the fight by unanimous decision. Uldedaj amassed a 7–0 record during the next two years, with two of those victories coming by way of stoppage.

Uldedaj fought for his first professional title on 3 February 2018, when he faced Jakub Synek for the vacant German International cruiserweight title. The fight was scheduled for the undercard of the Tom Schwarz and Samir Nebo heavyweight bout, and was broadcast by MDR Fernsehen. Uldedaj won the fight ten round bout of his career by unanimous decision, with two judges scoring the fight 100–89 in his favor, while the third judge scored it 100–88 for him.

Uldedaj faced the undefeated Nicolas Leandro Arganaraz for the vacant WBO Youth cruiserweight title on 15 December 2018, at the Olympic Park “Feti Borova” in Tirana, Albania, which was his first fight in Albania. Uldedaj captured the title by unanimous decision, with all three judges scoring the fight 98–91 for him. Uldedaj was scheduled to face Krzysztof Twardowski on 11 May 2019, for the interim WBC Youth title. He won the fight by unanimous decision, with all three judges awarding him a 97–93 scorecard.

Uldedaj faced Robert Grguric on 22 August 2020, following a 13-month absence from the sport. He won the fight by a second-round knockout. Uldedaj next faced the overmatched Bojan Cestic on 12 December 2020. He won the fight stoppage, as Cestic retired from the bout at the end of the third round.

Uldedaj was booked to face Dmytro Serguta for the vacant WBC Youth cruiserweight title on 17 July 2021, on the undercard of an MDR broadcast card. He won the bout by a seventh-round technical knockout, extending his finishing streak to three consecutive fights.

Professional boxing record

See also
 List of Albanians in Germany

References

Living people
1997 births
German male boxers
People from Lezhë
Albanian male boxers
Cruiserweight boxers